Bernadette Jordan  (born April 7, 1963) is a Canadian politician who served as Minister of Fisheries, Oceans, and the Canadian Coast Guard from 2019 to 2021. A member of the Liberal Party of Canada, she was elected to represent the riding of South Shore—St. Margarets in the House of Commons in the 2015 election and was defeated by Rick Perkins in 2021.

Early life and education
Born in Montreal to Scottish immigrants, her family moved to Middle LaHave, Nova Scotia in 1975. She participated in Girl Guides of Canada programs as a Brownie, a Guide, and as an adult volunteer member. Jordan graduated from St. Francis Xavier University in 1984 with a Bachelor of Arts in Political Science.

Before politics
From 2006 to 2014, Jordan worked as a development officer for the Health Services Foundation of the South Shore, where she was in charge of organizing fund raising events for health services foundation.

Political career
She narrowly won the Liberal Party's nomination in the South Shore riding by 22 votes of the 450 cast over Jennifer Naugler, school board chairwoman for the South Shore Regional School Board. Jordan was sworn into the federal cabinet on November 20, 2019, by Prime Minister Justin Trudeau as the Minister of Fisheries, Oceans, and the Canadian Coast Guard, which is responsible for Fisheries and Oceans Canada, and the Canadian Coast Guard. She served as Minister of Rural Economic Development from January until November 2019.

Jordan was defeated in her riding in the 2021 federal election by conservative candidate Rick Perkins.

Education
Through its COVID-19 Resilience Stream of the Investing in Canada Infrastructure Program. Two-level of government will allow over 250 public elementary schools to create new outdoor learning spaces or enhance existing ones. Schools will be able to this funding for things like school gardens, outdoor performance areas, and learning areas.  Jordan supported investing $5.6 million in partnership with the province to contributing $1.4 million.

Minister Jordan and the Canadian government is supporting seven undertakings in three schools Aspotogan Consolidated School, Bayview Community School and Chester District Elementary School are set to go through significant work to their HVAC frameworks which are expected to significantly reducing their carbon footprint.

Environment
As Minister of Fisheries, Oceans, and the Canadian Coast Guard, Jorden has committed to protecting ocean habitats from harmful activities, allowing marine ecosystems and species to recover and better withstand the impacts of climate change. As minister Jorden has committed to working towards protecting 30% by 2030. While working towards new ambitious global biodiversity targets under the Convention on Biological Diversity at the 15th Conference of Parties in Kunming, China in 2021.

Personal life
She and her husband, Dave,  have three children.

Electoral record

References

External links
 Official Website
 Bio & mandate from the Prime Minister
 

1963 births
Living people
21st-century Canadian politicians
21st-century Canadian women politicians
Anglophone Quebec people
Canadian people of Scottish descent
Liberal Party of Canada MPs
Members of the 29th Canadian Ministry
Members of the House of Commons of Canada from Nova Scotia
Members of the King's Privy Council for Canada
People from Lunenburg County, Nova Scotia
Politicians from Montreal
St. Francis Xavier University alumni
Women in Nova Scotia politics
Women government ministers of Canada
Women members of the House of Commons of Canada